Zhang Peng (born 1981-06-04 in Qingdao, Shandong) is a male Chinese sports sailor who competed for Team China at the 2008 Summer Olympics.

Peng placed 24th in the Finn Heavyweight Dinghy Mixed event.

Major performances
2001 National Games - 2nd Finn class;
2002/2005/2006/2007 National Championships - 1st Finn class;
2005/2007/2008 National Champions Tournament - 1st Finn class

References

1981 births
Living people
Chinese male sailors (sport)
Olympic sailors of China
Sportspeople from Qingdao
Sailors at the 2008 Summer Olympics – Finn